George is a masculine given name derived from the Greek Geōrgios. The name gained popularity due to its association with the Christian martyr, Saint George (died 23 April 303), a member of the Praetorian Guard who was sentenced to death for his refusal to renounce Christianity, and prior to that, it might have been a theophoric name, with origins in Zeus Georgos, an early title of the Greek god Zeus. Today, it is one of the most commonly used names in the Western world, though its religious significance has waned among modern populations. Its diminutives are Geordie and Georgie, with the former being limited primarily to residents of England and Scotland. The most popular feminine forms in the Anglosphere are Georgia, Georgiana, and Georgina.

History

Etymology and origins 
Its original Greek form, Georgios, is based on the Greek word georgos (γεωργός) 'farmer'. The word georgos itself is ultimately a combination of two Greek words: ge (γῆ) 'earth, soil' and ergon (ἔργον) 'work'. Aelius Herodianus (fl. 2nd century AD), a Roman-era Greek grammarian and writer, determined Georgios to be a theophoric name, or a name created to honor a deity, a nod to Zeus Georgos, or "Zeus the Farmer" in English. In the early stages of Greek mythology, before Zeus took on a major role in the Greek pantheon as ruler of all the gods and goddesses, he was sacrificed to as an agricultural god, a patron of crops and harvests. The name took on religious significance to followers of Early Christianity in 303 with the supposed martyrdom of Georgios, a Roman soldier of Greek heritage.  While the story's historical accuracy is subject to debate, his character took on real importance to the Christian Church, with Georgios and its variants being used as baptismal names and by religious officials and Christian monarchs, though it did not become common among the laity until after the Middle Ages.

Forms

In other languages 

 Albanian: Gjergj, Gjorgj, Xhorxh, Jorgji
Amharic: Giorgis (ጊዮርጊስ)
 Arabic: Jirjīs, Jirjis, Jawrj
 Egyptian Arabic: Gerges, Girgis
 Palestinian Arabic: Jiryes (جريس)
 Aragonese: Chorche
 Armenian: Gevorg (Գևորգ), Kevork (Western)
 Aramaic: Gewargis (ܓܝܘܪܓܝܣ), Gevargis, Gaggi (diminutive), Gaggo (diminutive), Givo (diminutive)
 Asturian: Xurde
 Basque: Gorka, Jurgi, Urtzi
 Belarusian: Yury (Юры), Yurka (Юрка) (diminutive)
 Breton: Jor, Jord
 Bulgarian: Georgi (Георги)
 Catalan: Jordi
 Chinese: Qiáozhì (乔治 in Simplified Chinese or 喬治 in Traditional Chinese)
 Cantonese: 佐治 (zo2 zi6 in Jyutping)
 Coptic: Georgios (Ⲅⲉⲟⲣⲅⲓⲟⲥ), Girgis (Ⲅⲓⲣⲅⲓⲥ)
 Croatian: Đuro, Juraj, Jure, Jurica
 Czech: Jiří
 Danish: Jørgen, Jørn
 Dutch: Joris, Juriaan/Juriaen (archaic spelling), Sjors
 English: Geordie (diminutive), George, Georgie (diminutive)
 Estonian: Georg, Jüri, Jürgen
 Faroese: Jørundur
 French: Georges
 Finnish: Jori, Jyri, Jyrki, Yrjänä, Yrjö
 Frisian: Jurjen
 Galician: Xurxo
 Georgian: Gio (გიო) (diminutive), Giorgi (გიორგი), Gia (გია) (diminutive), Goga (გოგა) (diminutive), Gogi (გოგი) (diminutive)
 German: Georg, Jirka, Jockel (diminutive), Jörg, Jörgen, Jürg, Jürgen, Jurian, Schorsch
 Greek: Geórgios (Γεώργιος) (Modern), Geṓrgios (Γεώργιος) (Koine), Tzortz (Τζορτζ) (English)
 Hindi: Jorj (जॉर्ज)
 Hungarian: György
 Icelandic: Georg
 Irish: Seóirse (also Seoirse)
 Italian: Giorgio, Giorgino (diminutive), Gino (diminutive)
 Japanese: Jōji (じょうじ、ジョージ)
 Korean: Jo-ji (조지)
 Latin: Georgius
 Latvian: Georgijs, Georgs, Jurģis, Juris
 Lithuanian: Georgijus, Jurgis
 Macedonian: Gjorgji (Ѓорѓи), Gjorgje (Ѓорѓе), Gjorgjija Ѓорѓија (Gjorgjija), Gjoko (Ѓоко)
 Malayalam: Geevarghese (when referring to Saint George), Varghese (വര്ഗീസ്); Jēārjj (ജോർജ്ജ്) (based on the English pronunciation)
 Maltese: Ġorġ, Ġorġa
 Manx: Shorys
 Māori: Hori
 Monegasque: Giorgi
 Norman: Jore
 Norwegian: Georg, Jørn, Ørjan, Jørgen
 Persian: Jurjis (جرجیس)
 Polish: Jerzy
 Portuguese: Jorge
 Romanian: George, Gheorghe, Georgiu
 Russian: Georgiy (Георгий), Yuriy (Юрий), Yegor (Егор)
 Samoan: Siaosi
 Scottish Gaelic: Deòrsa, Seòras
 Serbian: Đorđe (Ђорђе), Đorđo (Ђорђо), Đukan (Ђукан), Đurađ (Ђурађ), Đurđe (Ђурђе), Đoko (Ђоко), Đoka (Ђока), Đuro (Ђуро), Đura (Ђура), Georgije (Георгије)
 Slovak: Juraj
 Slovene: Jure, Jurij
 Spanish: Jorge
 Swedish: Georg, Göran, Jörgen, Jörn, Örjan
 Tamil: Jārj (ஜார்ஜ்)
 Thai: Čhort (จอร์จ; based on the English pronunciation), Yod (ยอด; a historical distorted interpretation of the name)
 Tibetan: Rdorje (རྡོ་རྗེ།)
 Tongan: Siaosi
 Turkish: Cercis, Circis, Curcis, Yorgi, Gürcü,
 Ukrainian: Heorhiy (Георгій), Yehor (Єгор), Yuriy (Юрій)
 Upper Sorbian: Jurij
 Venetian: Xorxi, Zorzi
 Vietnamese: Giorgiô
 Welsh: Siôr

Feminine forms 

 Bulgarian: Gergana (Гергана)
 Albanian: Jorgjia, Jorgjica, Gjeorgjina, Gjorgjina, Xhorxhina
 Czech: Jiřina
 Dutch: Georgina, Jorien
 English: Georgeanna, Georgeanne (also George Anne),Georgeana, Georgianna, Georgane, Georgann, Georgene, Georgenne, Georgenna, Georgia (also Jorja), Georgiana, Georgina, Georgie (diminutive), Gina (diminutive, also Geena), Georgette, Georenn
 French: George, Georgette, Georgine, Gigi
 Greek: Georgia (Γεωργία)
 Hungarian: Györgyi, Györgyike (diminutive)
 Italian: Giorgia, Giorgina (diminutive), Gina (diminutive)
 Latin: Georgia
 Portuguese: Jorgina
 Romanian: Georgeta, Georgiana
 Spanish: Georgina, Jorgelina

People with the given name

Late antiquity to early medieval

 George of Laodicea (d. 347)
 George of Cappadocia (d. 361)
 Georgius Florentius, birth name of Gregory of Tours (d. 594)
 Giorgio (fl. 610), cardinal under Pope Honorius I
 George of Izla (d. 615)
 George of Cyprus (7th century)
 George of Pisidia (7th century)
 George of Resh'aina (7th century)
 George I of Constantinople (d. 686)
 Patriarch George of Antioch (758–790), Patriarch of Antioch and head of the Syriac Orthodox Church
 George Syncellus (d. after 810)
 George Choiroboskos (9th century)
 George Hamartolos (d. 867)
 George II of Armenia, catholicos of Armenian Church (877–897)

High to late medieval

 Georgius Tzul (fl. 1016)
 Kingdom of Georgia
 George I of Georgia (d. 1027)
 George II of Georgia
 George III of Georgia
 George III of Imereti
 George IV of Georgia
 George V of Georgia
 George VI of Georgia
 George VII of Georgia
 George VII of Imereti
 George VIII of Georgia (George I of Kakheti, died 1476)
 George I of Imereti (late 14th century)
 George II of Kakheti (1464–1513)
 George of Chqondidi (d. 1118)
 Kievan Rus' 
 Yuriy Dolgorukiy (c. 1099 – 1157)
 Yuri II of Vladimir (1189–1238)
 Second Bulgarian Empire
 George I of Bulgaria, emperor of Bulgaria 1280–1292
 George II of Bulgaria, emperor of Bulgaria 1321–1322
 Đurađ I Balšić (fl. 1362–78), Lord of Zeta
 Đurađ II Balšić (1385–1403), Lord of Zeta
 Đurađ Bogutović (fl. 1370–99), Serbian nobleman
 Đurađ Branković (1377–1456), Serbian Despot
 Đurađ Đurašević (fl. 1413–35), Serbian nobleman
 Đurađ Crnojević (fl. 1489–1514), Lord of Zeta
 George of Antioch (d. 1252)
 George Akropolites (d. 1282)
 George (Ongud king) (d. 1298/9)
 Georgius Chrysococcas (fl. 1340s)
 Medieval Albania
 Gjergj Kastrioti Skanderbeg (1405–1468), Albanian prince and national hero
 Gjergj Arianiti (1383–1462), Albanian lord who led several campaigns against the Ottoman Empire
 Gjergj Thopia (died 1392), medieval Albanian nobleman and the lord of Durrës between 1388 and 1392
 Gjergj Pelini (died 1463), medieval Albanian Catholic priest and diplomat for Skanderbeg and Venice
 George Sphrantzes (d. 1478)
 George of Trebizond (d. 1486)

Renaissance to modern
See: 

 George Plantagenet, 1st Duke of Clarence (1449–1478) 
 Giorgio Cornaro (1452–1527)
 György Dózsa (1470–1514)
 George, Duke of Saxony (1471–1539)
 Yury Ivanovich (1480–1536)
 George, Duke of Coimbra (1481–1550), Portuguese Infante, natural son of King John II of Portugal
 György Szondy (1500–1552)
 Giorgio Basta (1540–1607)
 George Weymouth (1585–1612), English explorer
 George of Lencastre, 2nd Duke of Aveiro (1548–1578), Portuguese prince
 Giorgio Giorgicci (1614–1660)
 Kingdom of Great Britain
 George I of Great Britain (1660–1727)
 George II of Great Britain (1683–1760)
United Kingdom
 George III of the United Kingdom (1738–1820)
 George IV of the United Kingdom (1762–1830)
 George V of the United Kingdom (1865–1936)
 George VI of the United Kingdom (1895–1952)
 George Washington (1732–1799), first President of the United States (1789–97), and one of the Founding Fathers of the United States
George Gordon Byron, 6th Baron Byron, better known as Lord Byron (1788–1824), English author
 George Nicholas Eckert (1802–1865), US Congressman
 George Rex Graham (1813–1894), American magazine editor and publisher
 George Meade (1815-1872), American Civil War general
 Kingdom of Greece
 George I (1845–1913)
 George II (1890–1947)
 George W. Melville (1841-1912), U.S. Navy rear admiral
 George Deardorff McCreary (1846-1915), U.S. Congressman
 George Eastman (1854–1932), American entrepreneur and founder of the Eastman Kodak Company
 George Howard Earle Jr. (1856-1928), American lawyer and businessman
 George Alderink (1889-1977), American businessman and politician
 George Alice (born Georgia Mannion; 2003), Australian singer-songwriter
 George Appo (1856–1930), a thief from New York City
 George Eliot, a pen name for English writer Mary Ann Evans (1819–1880)
 George B. McFarland (1866–1942), Thai physician
 George Horace Lorimer (1867–1937), American editor of The Saturday Evening Post
 George A. Hulett (1867–1955), American chemist
 George Locke, (1870–1937), Canadian librarian
 George R. de Silva (1898–1968), Sri Lankan Sinhala politician
 George Dudley (1894–1960), Canadian ice hockey administrator and Hockey Hall of Fame inductee
 George Keyt (1901–1993), Sri Lankan painter
 George Metesky (1903–1994), American bomber and terrorist
 George Washington Vanderbilt III (1914–1961), American yachtsman and scientific explore
 George H. W. Bush (1924–2018), 41st President of the United States
 George Krull (1925–1957), one half of a brother's criminal duo from Pennsylvania
 George Christopher Rambukpotha (1884-1943), Sri Lankan Sinhala lawyer and politician, representative for Bibile in the 1st and 2nd State Council of Ceylon
 George Rajapaksa (1926–1976), Sri Lankan Sinhala politician
 George Stanich (born 1928), American high jumper
 George Carlin (1937–2008), American stand-up comedian, actor, social critic, and author
 George H. Morris (born 1938), American equestrian
 George Harrison (1943–2001), lead guitarist of the Beatles
 George Cecil Horry (1907–1981), British-born New Zealand confidence trickster, tailor and convicted murderer
 George W. Bush, 43rd President of the United States; son of George H. W. Bush
 George Clooney (born 1961), American actor, film producer, director, and activist
 George Dario Franchitti (born 1973), Scottish racing driver
 George Zidek (born 1973), Czech basketball player
 George Floyd (1973–2020), American man murdered by police during an arrest in Minneapolis, Minnesota
 George Clanton, American electronic musician
 George Mayienga, Kenyan basketball coach 
 George Robertson (born 1946), British politician
 George Russell (born 1958), American thief and serial killer
 George Hill (disambiguation), multiple people
 George Michael (1963–2016), English pop singer, songwriter and philanthropist
 George Seitz (1894–1976), American murder victim
 George Simion (born 1986), Romanian activist and politician
 George Piștereanu (born 1990), Romanian actor
 George Felix Michel Melki (born 1994), Swedish-Lebanese footballer
 George Russell (born 1998), English racing driver
 Prince George of Wales (born 2013), second-in-line to the British throne
 George Alfred Henry Wille (1871–1951), Sri Lankan Burgher proctor, notary public, journalist, and politician

See also

 Georg (disambiguation)
 George (disambiguation)
 George (surname)
 Georgeanna
 Georgeson
 Georgiev
 Georgievski
 Georgios
 Giorgos
 Saint George (disambiguation)
 Georgia (disambiguation)
 Geordie

References

Given names of Greek language origin
English masculine given names

Romanian masculine given names